The 2010–11 Lega Pro Prima Divisione season was the thirty-third football league season of Italian Lega Pro Prima Divisione since its establishment in 1978, and the third since the renaming from Serie C to Lega Pro.

It will be divided into two phases: the regular season, and the playoff phase.

The league will also be composed of 36 teams divided into two divisions of 18 teams each, whose teams will be divided geographically. Teams will play only other teams in their own division, once at home and once away for a total of 34 matches each.

Teams finishing first in the regular season, plus one team winning the playoff round from each division will be promoted to Serie B; teams finishing last in the regular season, plus two relegation playoff losers from each division will be relegated to Lega Pro Seconda Divisione. In all, four teams will be promoted to Serie B, and six teams will be relegated to Lega Pro Seconda Divisione.

Events

Start of season
The league was to feature four teams relegated from Serie B in 2009–10. Triestina, Mantova, Gallipoli and Salernitana. But on July 17, 2010 Mantova and Gallipoli was excluded by the Federal Council and relegated to Serie D and Promozione respectively. Because of the exclusion of Ancona from Serie B Triestina was admitted back to fill the vacancy on August 4, 2010.

It is to feature six teams promoted from 2009–10 Lega Pro Seconda Divisione; the three division winners - F.C. Südtirol, Lucchese and Juve Stabia, and the three playoff winners - Spezia, Gubbio and Cisco Roma (later renamed Atletico Roma).

The remaining 26 teams were to come from the teams that played in 2009–10 Lega Pro Prima Divisione that were neither promoted nor relegated. Of those, Arezzo (4th in Girone A), Perugia (11th in Girone A), Rimini (4th in Girone B) and Real Marcianise (12th in Girone B) were also listed by the Covisoc organization as not having met the financial requirements to be admitted. On 17 July 2010 these teams were officially excluded from the league along with Figline (7th in Girone A) by Federal Council's decision.

On 4 August 2010, the eight vacancies created were filled by the following teams, all of which were destined to play in Lega Pro Seconda Divisione for the 2010-11 season before the call-up:
 Paganese, which finished 17th in Prima Divisione 2009-10 - Girone A, originally relegated for losing in the playouts.
 Pavia, which finished 5th and lost in the playoff semi-finals in Seconda Divisione 2009-10 - Girone A
 Bassano Virtus, which finished 7th in Seconda Divisione 2009-10 - Girone B
 Nocerina, which finished 13th in Seconda Divisione 2009-10 - Girone B
 Barletta, which finished 5th and lost in the playoff semi-finals in Seconda Divisione 2009-10 - Girone C
 Siracusa, which finished 6th in Seconda Divisione 2009-10 - Girone C
 Gela, which finished 7th in Seconda Divisione 2009-10 - Girone C
 Pisa, which finished 1st in Serie D 2009-10 - Girone D

Girone A

Teams

League table

Results

Play-offs

Promotion
Semifinals
First legs scheduled 29 May 2011; return legs scheduled 5 June 2011

Final
First leg scheduled 12 June 2011; return leg scheduled 19 June 2011

Relegation
First legs scheduled 29 May 2011; return legs scheduled 5 June 2011

5. If aggregate is tied, the worst placed team in regular season is relegated

Südtirol and Monza relegated to Lega Pro Seconda divisione

Girone B

Teams

League table

Results

Play-offs

Promotion
Semifinals
First legs scheduled 29 May 2011; return legs scheduled 5 June 2011

Aggregate Tie: the higher seed advances

Final
First leg scheduled 12 June 2011; return leg scheduled 19 June 2011

Relegation
First legs scheduled 29 May 2011; return legs scheduled 5 June 2011

Supercoppa di Lega di Prima Divisione

References

Lega Pro Prima Divisione seasons
Italy
3